A digester (alternative: digestor) is a huge vessel where chemical or biological reactions are carried out. These are used in different types of process industries.

Processes where digesters are used
 Anaerobic digestion
 Bayer process
 Kraft process
 Sulfite process
 Soda process

Chemical process engineering

de:Faulturm